The Sentinel-class cutter, also known as Fast Response Cutter due to its program name, is part of the United States Coast Guard's Deepwater program. At  it is similar to, but larger than the  lengthened 1980s-era s that it replaces. Up to 58 vessels are to be built by the Louisiana-based firm Bollinger Shipyards, using a design from the Netherlands-based Damen Group, with the Sentinel design based on the company's Damen Stan 4708 patrol vessel.  The Department of Homeland Security's budget proposal to Congress, for the Coast Guard, for 2021, stated that, in addition to 58 vessels to serve the Continental US, they requested an additional six vessels for its portion of Patrol Forces South West Asia.

Planning and acquisition
On March 14, 2007, newly appointed United States Coast Guard Commandant Thad Allen announced that the USCG had withdrawn a contract from Lockheed Martin and Northrop Grumman for the construction of an initial flawed design of what would eventually become the Sentinel class.
Allen announced that instead of the initial high-tech design Bollinger would build vessels based on an existing design, and the new program would focus more on existing "off-the-shelf" technology.

On September 26, 2008, Bollinger Shipyards in Lockport, Louisiana, United States, was awarded US$88 million to build a prototype.
The vessel would be the first of a series of 24–34  cutters built to a design largely based on the Damen Stan 4708 patrol vessels from the Netherlands firm the Damen Group. 
The South African government operates three similar 154 ft Lillian Ngoyi-class vessels for environmental and fishery patrol.

The first cutter, and all future Sentinel-class vessels would be named after enlisted Coast Guard heroes. Bernard C. Webber was launched on Thursday, April 21, 2011, and commissioned on Saturday, April 14, 2012 at the Port of Miami.

Bernard C. Webber, and five sister ships, are stationed in Miami, Florida. The second cohort of six vessels is homeported in Key West, Florida, while the third cohort of six vessels is homeported in San Juan, Puerto Rico.

On September 26, 2013, Marine Link reported that the Coast Guard had placed orders with Bollinger Shipyards for additional cutters, bringing the number of such cutters ordered by then to thirty.
As of June 23, 2016, eight more for a total of 38 FRCs have been ordered, 17 are in service, with six in Miami, Florida; six in Key West, Florida; and five in San Juan, Puerto Rico.
The 18th fast response cutter, Joseph Tezanos, was delivered to the Coast Guard in Key West, Florida, on June 22, 2016. That cutter will be the sixth stationed in San Juan, Puerto Rico, and will complete the USCG complement there.

The Coast Guard has announced four future FRCs will be stationed in San Pedro, California by 2019 and two more will be stationed in Astoria, Oregon starting in 2021. A total of six FRCs will eventually be homeported in Alaska, with one cutter in Sitka, one in Seward, and two in Kodiak, joining two already operating from Ketchikan. Boston, Massachusetts and St. Petersburg, Florida will also eventually be FRC homeports.

In June 2019, the United States House Committee on Armed Services approved a requirement for the US Navy to study the possibility of buying a version of the FRC, and basing them in Bahrain, where the USCG currently plans to base four FRCs.

In 2022, the Coast Guard awarded a $30 million contract to install a fixed pier and two floating docks to accommodate FRC's at East Tongue Point in Oregon. The first new cutter is expected to arrive at Astoria, Oregon in March 2024 rather than in 2021 as originally planned.

Mission

The vessels will perform various Coast Guard missions which include but are not limited to PWCS (Ports, Waterways, and Coastal Security), Defense Operations, Maritime Law Enforcement (Drug/migrant interdiction and other Law Enforcement), Search and Rescue, Marine Safety, and environment protection.

Design and construction

The vessels are armed with a remote-control Mark 38 25 mm Machine Gun System and four crew-served .50-caliber (12.7 mm) M2HB heavy machine guns. They have a bow thruster for maneuvering in crowded anchorages and channels. They also have small underwater fins, for coping with the rolling and pitching caused by large waves. They are manned by a crew of 22. The Fast Response Cutter deploys the  Cutter Boat - Over the Horizon (OTH-IV) for rescues and interceptions. The vessels are built to ABS High Speed Naval Craft rules and some parts of the FRC also comply to ABS Naval Vessel Rules. The vessels meet Naval Sea Systems Command standards for two compartment damaged stability and also meet the Intact and Damage Stability and reserve buoyancy requirements in accordance with the “Procedures Manual for Stability Analyses of U.S. Navy Small Craft". The vessels have space, weight, and power reserved for future requirements which includes weapons and their systems. The cutters have a reduced radar cross-section through shaping.

On September 26, 2008, Bollinger Shipyards in Lockport, Louisiana, was awarded US$88 million to build the prototype first vessel in its class. That vessel became USCGC Bernard C. Webber, which is the first of 58 planned Sentinel-class cutters to go into the U.S. Coast Guard fleet to replace their remaining 37 aging, 1980s-era 110 ft Island-class patrol boats.

On February 7, 2013, the Department of Homeland Security requested tenders from third party firms to independently inspect the cutters, during their construction, and their performance trials.

The bridge is equipped with a handheld device that allows crew members to remotely control the ship's functions, including rudder movement and docking.

On July 24, 2014, it was announced that the U.S. Coast Guard had exercised a $225 million option at Bollinger Shipyards for construction through 2017 of an additional six Sentinel-class Fast Response Cutters (FRCs), bringing the total number of FRCs under contract with Bollinger to 30. Later that number was increased to 32 cutters.

On May 4, 2016, Bollinger Shipyards announced that the U.S. Coast Guard awarded it a new contract for building the final 26 Sentinel-class fast-response cutters. That brings to 58 the total number of FRCs that the USCG ordered from Bollinger. Acquiring the 58 cutters is expected to cost the federal government $3.8 billion — an average of about $65 million per cutter.

On August 11, 2021, it was announced that U.S. Coast Guard had exercised a contract option for 4 additional FRC's, bringing the total number to 64.  They will be built at Bollinger's Lockport, Louisiana facility.

On March 15, 2022, President Joe Biden signed the Consolidated Appropriations Act for Fiscal Year 2022, which provided $130 million in funding for two additional FRC's, bringing the total number to 66. On August 9, 2022, the Coast Guard exercised its contract option for the first of these additional cutters, to be delivered by Bollinger in 2025.

At the September 28, 2022 commissioning of USCGC Douglas Denman, it was announced that she had several upgrades compared to the two cutters deployed to Ketchikan, Alaska six years previously. These include an improved bow thruster and radar system and the addition of a forward-looking infrared camera. Though initially stationed at Ketchikan, Douglas Denman will eventually be homeported at Sitka when port infrastructure improvements have been completed there.

Crew accommodation
Prior to the deployment of the Marine Protector class, the Coast Guard decided that all its cutters, even its smallest, should be able to accommodate mixed-gender crews, and the Sentinel-class cutters are also able to accommodate mixed-gender crews. When  was commissioned, a profile in The Philadelphia Inquirer asserted off-duty crew members had access to satellite television broadcasts. The vessels come equipped with a desalination unit.

Ships

On October 27, 2010, the Coast Guard released the names of the first 14 Coast Guard enlisted heroes for whom the Sentinel-class FRCs will be named.

On February 10, 2015, the USCG solicited vendors to bid to provide temporary lodging services for pre-commissioning crews in Lockport for each of 19 specific cutters to be launched for 19 specific date periods per vessel from April 19, 2015, out through December 28, 2018.

Operational histories

Press coverage of the vessels' operational histories suggests they have been effective at interdicting refugees who resort to dangerous overloaded small boats, and effective at capturing drug smugglers.

The cutters have also intercepted smugglers carrying large shipments of drugs. In February 2017 Joseph Napier intercepted a shipment of over four tons of cocaine, reported to be the largest drug-bust in the Atlantic Ocean since 1999.

Additionally, cutters are given tasks like looking for shipping containers full of toxic cargo that have fallen from container ships, as  did in December 2015, when 25 containers fell from the barge .  
Similarly, Charles Sexton helped search for the freighter  when she was lost at sea during Hurricane Joaquin in October 2015.

In 2018 and 2019 Oliver Berry and Joseph Gerczak made voyages beyond the design range, on missions from Hawaii to the Marshall Islands and American Samoa. Both voyages took nine days.

In August 2022, one of the ships in the Sentinel class, Oliver Henry, was stuck in the Solomon islands after the latter refused a fuel request.

Namesakes
Charles "Skip" W. Bowen, who was then the Master Chief Petty Officer of the Coast Guard, is credited with leading the initiative of naming the vessels after enlisted rank individuals who served heroically in the Coast Guard, or one of its precursor services.
Originally the first vessel of the class was to be named USCGC Sentinel.

In October 2010 the Coast Guard named the first fourteen individuals the vessels will be named after, and has provided biographies of them.
They are:
Bernard C. Webber, 
Richard Etheridge, 
William Flores, 
Robert Yered, 
Margaret Norvell, 
Paul Clark, 
Charles David Jr, 
Charles Sexton, 
Kathleen Moore, 
Joseph Napier, 
William Trump, 
Isaac Mayo, 
Richard Dixon, 
Heriberto Hernandez.
A second group of eleven names was announced on April 2, 2014.

In 2013 the name of Joseph Napier was reassigned to WPC-1115
when WPC-1110 was named after the recently deceased Commander Raymond Evans.
The other ten new namesakes were:
Winslow W. Griesser,
Richard H. Patterson,
Joseph Tezanos,
Rollin A. Fritch,
Lawrence O. Lawson,
John F. McCormick,
Bailey T. Barco,
Benjamin B. Dailey,
Donald R. Horsley, and
Jacob L. A. Poroo. The 17th cutter (ex-USCGC Richard H. Patterson) was renamed as Donald R. Horsley after request of the Patterson Family, and the 24th cutter (ex-USCGC Donald R. Horsley) then was renamed as Oliver F. Berry.

On July 30, 2014, Coast Guard Commandant, Paul Zukunft, announced that the Coast Guard would name an additional cutter after Senior Chief Petty Officer Terrell Horne, the first Coast Guard member to be murdered in the line of duty since 1927.

In February, 2015, the Coast Guard publicized ten more names tentatively assigned to cutters 26 through 35.
They were: 
Joseph Gerczak,
Richard T. Snyder,
Nathan Bruckenthal,
Forrest O. Rednour,
Robert G. Ward,
Terrell Horne III,
Benjamin A. Bottoms,
Joseph O. Doyle,
William C. Hart, and
Oliver F. Berry.

On December 12, 2017, the Coast Guard announced the names of the 35th through 54th cutters.  The twenty namesakes are:
Angela McShan, 
Daniel Tarr, 
Edgar Culbertson, 
Harold Miller, 
Myrtle Hazard, 
Oliver Henry, 
Charles Moulthrope, 
Robert Goldman, 
Frederick Hatch, 
Glen Harris, 
Emlen Tunnell, 
John Scheuerman, 
Clarence Sutphin, 
Pablo Valent, 
Douglas Denman, 
William Chadwick, 
Warren Deyampert, 
Maurice Jester, 
John Patterson, 
William Sparling. The 35th cutter (ex-USCGC Oliver F. Berry) is to be named as Angela McShan since the 24th cutter (ex-USCGC Donald R. Horsley) was renamed as Oliver F. Berry.

On October 23, 2019, the Coast Guard named the namesakes of cutters 55 through 64.  They are:
Melvin Bell,
David Duren,
Florence Finch,
John Witherspoon,
Earl Cunningham,
Frederick Mann,
Olivia Hooker,
Vincent Danz,
Jeffrey Palazzo,
Marvin Perrett.

References

External links